The Long Bay Correctional Complex, commonly called Long Bay, is a correctional facility comprising a heritage-listed maximum and minimum security prison for males and females and a hospital to treat prisoners, psychiatric cases and remandees, located in Malabar, Sydney, New South Wales, Australia. The facility is operated by Corrective Services New South Wales, a department administered by the Government of New South Wales.

The Complex accepts sentenced and unsentenced felons under New South Wales and/or Commonwealth legislation and comprises three separate facilities including the Long Bay Hospital (a maximum security institution for medical and psychiatric cases); the Metropolitan Special Programs Centre (a maximum/minimum security institution); and the Special Purpose Centre (a maximum security institution for inmates requiring special protection).

Designed by Walter Liberty Vernon, the complex is listed on the New South Wales State Heritage Register with the following statement of significance:

History

Indigenous history
Before the 1780s, local Aboriginal people in the area used the site for fishing and cultural activities - rock engravings, grinding grooves and middens remain in evidence.
In 1789, Governor Philip referred to "a long bay", which became known as Long Bay. Aboriginal people are believed to have inhabited the Sydney region for at least 20,000 years. The population of Aboriginal people between Palm Beach and Botany Bay in 1788 has been estimated to have been 1500. Those living south of Port Jackson to Botany Bay were the Cadigal people who spoke Dharug, while the local clan name of Maroubra people was "Muru-ora-dial". By the mid nineteenth century the traditional owners of this land had typically either moved inland in search of food and shelter, or had died as the result of European disease or confrontation with British colonisers.

Colonial history
One of the earliest land grants in this area was made in 1824 to Captain Francis Marsh, who received  bounded by the present Botany and High Streets, Alison and Belmore Roads. In 1839 William Newcombe acquired the land north-west of the present town hall in Avoca Street.

Randwick takes its name from the town of Randwick, Gloucestershire, England. The name was suggested by Simeon Pearce (1821–86) and his brother James. Simeon was born in the English Randwick and the brothers were responsible for the early development of both Randwick and its neighbour, Coogee. Simeon had come to the colony in 1841as a 21 year old surveyor. He built his Blenheim House on the  he bought from Marsh, and called his property "Randwick". The brothers bought and sold land profitably in the area and elsewhere. Simeon campaigned for construction of a road from the city to Coogee (achieved in 1853) and promoted the incorporation of the suburb. Pearce sought construction of a church modelled on the church of St. John in his birthplace. In 1857 the first St Jude's stood on the site of the present post office, at the corner of the present Alison Road and Avoca Street.

Randwick was slow to progress. The village was isolated from Sydney by swamps and sandhills, and although a horse-bus was operated by a man named Grice from the late 1850s, the journey was more a test of nerves than a pleasure jaunt. Wind blew sand over the track, and the bus sometimes became bogged, so that passengers had to get out and push it free. From its early days Randwick had a divided society. The wealthy lived elegantly in large houses built when Pearce promoted Randwick and Coogee as a fashionable area. But the market gardens, orchards and piggeries that continued alongside the large estates were the lot of the working class. Even on the later estates that became racing empires, many jockeys and stablehands lived in huts or even under canvas. An even poorer group were the immigrants who existed on the periphery of Randwick in a place called Irishtown, in the area now known as The Spot, around the junction of St.Paul's Street and Perouse Road. Here families lived in makeshift houses, taking on the most menial tasks in their struggle to survive.

In 1858 when the NSW Government passed the Municipalities Act, enabling formation of municipal districts empowered to collect rates and borrow money to improve their suburb, Randwick was the first suburb to apply for the status of a municipality. It was approved in February 1859, and its first Council was elected in March 1859.

Randwick had been the venue for sporting events, as well as duels and illegal sports, from the early days in the colony's history. Its first racecourse, the Sandy Racecourse or Old Sand Track, had been a hazardous track over hills and gullies since 1860. When a move was made in 1863 by John Tait, to establish Randwick Racecourse, Simeon Pearce was furious, especially when he heard that Tait also intended to move into Byron Lodge. Tait's venture prospered, however and he became the first person in Australia to organise racing as a commercial sport. The racecourse made a big difference to the progress of Randwick. The horse-bus gave way to trams that linked the suburb to Sydney and civilisation. Randwick soon became a prosperous and lively place, and it still retains a busy residential, professional and commercial life.

Today, some of the houses have been replaced by home units. Many European migrants have made their homes in the area, along with students and workers at the nearby University of NSW and the Prince of Wales Hospital.

Long Bay Jail history

Long Bay was opened due to the imminent closure of Darlinghurst Gaol. The State Reformatory for Women was opened in 1909 and the State Penitentiary for Men was opened beside it in 1914. Gallows were in operation at the complex from 1917 to 1939. The reformatory became part of the prison in the late 1950s, known as the Long Bay Penitentiary. After the Silverwater Women's Correctional Centre (formerly known as Mulawa) was opened in 1970, the women's prison was vacated and converted into a medium security prison for men.

A report on prison reform released in 1946 found overcrowding at Long Bay. It recommended that sewerage replace pan systems in major gaols and that prisoners should have two more hours each day out of their cells.

On Christmas Eve (24 December) 1985, Australian musician Paul Kelly performed at Long Bay.

A significant public health case arose in July 1990 when a mentally ill, HIV-positive prisoner was being escorted in the exercise yard. The prisoner took a syringe filled with his blood and stabbed a probationary prison officer. The prison officer was diagnosed with the virus five weeks later and died in 1997, aged 28.

In the late 1990s the facility was redeveloped to offer special treatment units which offer programs for sex offenders; those with intellectual disabilities; drug and alcohol abuse; or the use of violence.

Australian serial killer Ivan Milat spent the rest of his life in prison at Long Bay until his death on 27 October 2019.

Katingal facility
In 1975 a prominent supermax prison block was completed, known as Katingal. It was designed to house terrorists as well as problematic prisoners which had been identified as difficult offenders within the NSW prison system, replacing the intractable section at Grafton Gaol. It was dubbed as an ‘electronic zoo' by inmates due to its electronically controlled confinement with artificial lights and air, depriving inmates from almost all contact from the outside world.  The facility with its 40 prison cells had electronically operated doors, accompanied by several surveillance cameras, which were to supplement the existent security facilities within the unit. Although the unit did not have windows, it was serviced by a fully integrated air-conditioning system which circulated fresh air throughout. Additionally, inmates were permitted to engage in physical exercise in two purpose-built yards situated at each end of the unit. Several 'blind spots' that were not corrected during the initial design and construction of the facility led to escapes by inmates, including Russell 'Mad Dog' Cox, an armed robber and hostage-taker, who escaped after cutting through a bar on the roof of one of the exercise yards.

The facility became the centre of mainly critical media attention, and was heavily criticised by Justice John Nagle during proceedings of the Nagle Royal Commission (1976–1978) who recommended its immediate closure. The recommendation that Katingal be closed was accepted, but only after a campaign lasting months.

On 17 March 1989 Michael Yabsley, Minister for Corrective Services, announced that Katingal would be reopened as a correctional facility. When it was realised that the redevelopment of the site would cost double the 8 million allocated, plans were put on hold until a feasibility study was completed on the entire Long Bay prison complex. Demolition of Katingal began in March 2006.

Description 
Male Penitentiary:
The former Male Penitentiary comprised 6 two-storey cell wings, a debtors' prison, workshop, hospital and observation ward, all arranged around three sides of the complex with a "sterile zone" between them and the perimeter wall. The kitchen block stood in the centre facing the entrance block. The Penitentiary incorporated 352 single cells of size 3.96x2.13m and 3 punishment cells.

Four of the six wings had back-to-back cells opening directly to the outdoors.

The same palette of materials was used by Vernon throughout the dual prison establishment. Walls are predominantly of brick, good quality "commons" of a drab brown colour, with plain or rusticated sandstone dressing around windows and doors, and roofs of corrugated iron.

Entrance Block:
The exception is the entrance block which evokes a medieval castle gatehouse in Federation Gothic style. Technological advances such as electric lighting, reinforced concrete floors and the new tramway were made full use of in the design.

Condition 

As at 8 November 2000, most of the external brickwork of the cell wings have been painted and unsympathetic alterations and additions have occurred over the years. However, most of the original fabric remains intact. All buildings appear to be in good condition.

Modifications and dates 
The workshop, kitchen and observation ward have been demolished and the back-to-back cell wings have been disused for some time.

s the Penitentiary was reported as overcrowded, receiving 70% of all gaol entries and functioning as a remand centre. The overflow was accommodated by timber huts erected between the male and female prisons, and part of the women's prison in 1945.
1962 Penitentiary absorbed the old Reformatory.
1978 Observation Ward demolished. Christmas Day 1978, workshops were burnt down during a riot.
1993 after a series of name changes, the Penitentiary, together with the former Reformatory, was renamed Reception and Industrial Centre.
2008 Forensic Hospital established outside the prison wall on western "corner" of site. The Pharmacy was established in the ground floor of this hospital.

Current divisions

 it was reported that the prison held approximately 1,200 prisoners, with capacity estimated as 1,000, resulting in overcrowding of the correctional centre.

Long Bay Hospital 
The new Long Bay Hospital is a maximum security facility which holds a total of 120 inmate patients in four wards. It is jointly administered by Corrective Services NSW and NSW Health's Justice Health and Forensic Mental Health Network (Justice Health). The hospital became operational in July 2008, replacing the old Long Bay Hospital which was completely demolished in October 2008. The site of the old Long Bay Hospital is now the Long Bay Forensic Hospital, which took its first patients in late November 2008.

The old hospital was prominent in the news in January 2006 when rapist and armed robber Robert Cole, who was serving a 14-year sentence, lost  and slipped through the bars of his "A" ward cell. Cole was recaptured three days later at Bondi Junction and was sentenced to an additional and cumulative 12 months for the escape.

It was again in the news from 2015, when David Dungay, an Aboriginal man, died aged 26 in the hospital. Dungay had diabetes and schizophrenia, and died after being held down by five officers who had asked him to stop eating biscuits, while being injected with a sedative by a prison nurse. A coronial inquest in November 2019 found that none of the officers should face disciplinary action, saying that their “conduct was limited by systemic efficiencies in training”, but the professional conduct of the nurse should be reviewed by the Nursing Board.

Metropolitan Special Programs Centre (MSPC)
Until recently called the 'Malabar Special Programs Centre', the MSPC is a maximum through to minimum security facility which houses many types of inmates. It is the second largest gaol in terms of inmate population in New South Wales. It holds remand inmates, medical transients (inmates undertaking medical treatment), inmates with short sentences and inmates undertaking therapeutic programs. The programs areas of the gaol comprises the Violent Offenders Therapeutic Program (VOTP), Developmentally Delayed Program, Lifestyles Unit (for HIV-positive inmates), which has been unused and empty since 2002, the Kevin Waller Unit for at-risk female inmates (currently used as an assessment unit for aged male inmates), Acute Crisis Management Unit (ACMU) for active suicidal and self-harmers, Multi Purpose Unit or Segregation (high risk inmates on segregation orders and inmates requiring non association for safety) and CUBIT (CUstody Based Intensive Therapy) sex offender program.

A large part of the maximum security area is a transit area where prisoners await a bed in their gaol of classification, or stay whilst obtaining medical treatment/surgery, or are held on remand whilst awaiting trial. 
'Metropolitan Medical Transit Centre/LBH2' was a maximum security facility used to hold inmates who had been discharged from Long Bay Hospital or were awaiting medical appointments. Since closure in January 2006 the MSPC now undertakes the role of housing inmates receiving medical treatment. The MMTC re-opened in 2009 but now holds general population remand and medical transit inmates.

Special Purpose Centre (SPC)
The Special Purpose Centre is a maximum security facility which holds inmates requiring special, or strict, protection. As of 2001, the SPC had the capacity to hold up to 65 inmates who are placed in this unit as selected by an Interdepartmental Committee that includes senior police and correctional personnel who authenticate the information supplied by the offenders to ensure that protection is warranted. Many of these offenders are informers who never return to mainstream prison population and are only ever referred to by a number (such as CP01, Commissioners Pleasure 01). Corrective Services NSW advises that there are, however, numerous examples of inmates who make the transition from the SPC to other centres. The identities of inmates housed in this location are not disclosed and staff working there must sign confidentiality agreements.

This Centre is often referred to as the bomb shelter or super grass by other inmates and houses police informants, inmates with bad debts and anyone else the commissioner of corrective services deems to be at risk and unable to be managed in standard protective custody.

Notable prisoners

The following individuals have served all or part of their sentence at the Long Bay Correctional Centre:

One of the killers of Dr Victor Chang, Chiew Seng Liew, a Malaysian citizen, was in Long Bay jail. He was released into the custody of waiting immigration officials and was deported to Malaysia soon after this.

Cultural depictions
Long Bay Gaol has featured in several books: 
 Australia's Hardest Prison: Inside the Walls of Long Bay Gaol" (2014), a non-fiction work by James Phelps
 Long Bay (2015), a novel by Eleanor Limprecht telling the story of Rebecca Sinclair, who was sentenced to three years' Hard Labour for manslaughter after conducting an abortion, and was one of the gaol's first inmates in 1909.
 Permission to Lie'' (2011), a collection of short stories by Julie Chevalier set in prisons in Australia and the United States of America. Seven of the stories are set in Long Bay Gaol.

Music programs
Long Bay Gaol was the first Australian Gaol to pioneer inmate music rehab programs in 1993 with the release of the Hope Album with Captive Edition and Ricky Jones, produced and directed by Vincent Ruello.

Heritage listing 
As at 8 November 2000, the former State Penitentiary is of considerable significance. It was the first purpose-built Penitentiary in NSW and includes a rare example of back-to-back cells. In conjunction with the former Female Reformatory, it is an important development in Australian penal design and is the most complete expression of Frederick Neitenstein's philosophy of reform. The siting of the Penitentiary has a strong visual impact in the surrounding landscape. The original buildings are of a unified scale and materials resulting in a harmonious appearance. The place has been used continuously as the principal prison complex in NSW and as Sydney's major metropolitan gaol for over 80 years. It has research potential in penal practices and building technology of the time.

Long Bay Correctional Centre was listed on the New South Wales State Heritage Register on 2 April 1999.

See also

Punishment in Australia

References

Citations

Sources 

 
 
 
 
 
 
 
 
 
 
 

 Attribution

Further reading
 – an interesting article by a health solicitor from the Public Interest Advocacy Centre that includes learnings from a coronial inquest formed following a death in custody, while waiting admission into the acute ward of Long Bay Hospital.

External links

Long Bay Correctional Centre
Metropolitan Special Programs Centre
Malabar Special Purpose Centre
  [CC-By-SA]

1909 establishments in Australia
Maximum security prisons in Australia
Prisons in Sydney
Government buildings completed in 1909
Walter Liberty Vernon buildings in Sydney
Malabar, New South Wales
New South Wales State Heritage Register
Articles incorporating text from the New South Wales State Heritage Register